Peperomia versicolor is a species of epiphyte or lithophyte from the genus Peperomia. It grows in wet tropical biomes. It was discovered by William Trelease and published the species in the book "Contributions from the United States National Herbarium 26(4): 200. 1929". First-ever specimens were founded in Costa Rica and 1926.  versicolor means particolored or changes its color.

Distribution
Peperomia versicolor is native from Nicaragua to Ecuador. Specimens can be collected at an elevation of 780 - 2000 meters.

Costa Rica
Cartago
Reventazón River
Alajuela
San Carlos
Fortuna
San Ramón
Angeles
Upala
Aguas Claras
Limón
Siquirres
Florida
Puntarenas
Golfito
Jiménez
San José
Pérez Zeledón
Rivas

Colombia
Antioquia
Sopetrán
Jardín
Frontino
Urrao
Envigado
Campamento
Amalfi
Valle del Cauca
Yotoco
Restrepo
Santander
Encino
Nariño
Barbacoas
Altaquer
Risaralda
Pereira
Meta
La Macarena

Panama
Coclé
Chiriquí

Ecuador
Manabi
Flavio Alfaro
Zamora-Chinchipe
Napo
Carchi
Pichincha

Nicaragua
Granada
Estelí
Jinotega
Bocay
Río San Juan
Matagalpa
Atlántico Norte

Belize
Toledo

Peperomia niveo-punctulata

Costa Rica
Limón

Peperomia pilulifera

Costa Rica
Limón

Description
It is a small stoloniferous-erect glabrous epiphytic herb. Its stem is 2 millimeters thick with short internodes. Leaves alternate, they are lance-shaped and acute at both ends. It is 5-nerved, thin-leathered, opaque, and purple-red beneath. Its petioles are 3 millimeters long. It has terminal spikes and axillary and a peduncle that is 5 millimeters long, leaves are round-peltate.

Subtaxa
The following are recognized as synonyms.

Peperomia niveopunctulata 
Peperomia pilulifera

References

versicolor
Flora of Costa Rica
Flora of Ecuador
Flora of Nicaragua
Flora of Colombia
Flora of Belize
Flora of Honduras
Plants described in 1929
Taxa named by William Trelease